"I Want You" / "Me Pones Sexy" is the first single from the Mexican Latin pop singer Thalía's 2003 crossover studio album Thalía. The track features American rapper Fat Joe and is notable for its sample of Brenda Russell's song "A Little Bit of Love". The song peaked at number 22 on the US Billboard Hot 100. Both songs were written by Cory Rooney, Davy Deluge, Gregory Bruno, Fat Joe, Thalía, and Brenda Russell, and produced by Cory Rooney and Davy Deluge.

Promotion
Thalía performed the song on various shows to promote it including Good Morning America. In December 2003, Thalía was invited to the Jingle Ball along with other artists such as Jennifer Lopez, Britney Spears, Kelly Clarkson, Beyonce, Sean Paul, and Simple Plan and where she was the first of nine artists to sing where she performed the song along with her hits "Dance Dance (The Mexican)", "Baby, I'm in Love", and "¿A Quién le Importa?".

Chart performance
"I Want You" became a modest success, peaking at number 22 on the US Billboard Hot 100 chart. The song also achieved international success in countries like Australia, Canada, New Zealand, and Romania.

Music video
The music video for "I Want You" was directed by Dave Meyers and shot in The Bronx, New York. The video aired in May 2003. It won an award for "Video of the Year" on Lo Nuestro Awards in the next year in Latin America.

In the video, Thalía seduces some bricklayers and sings while some guys are playing basketball. Fat Joe also appears in the video.

Track listings
CD single
 "I Want You" [Radio Edit] – 3:34
 "It's My Party" [English Version of "Arrasando"] – 3:57
 "I Want You" [Pablo Flores Club Mix] – 8:21

Mexican 2-track promotional only CD
 "Me Pones Sexy"
 "I Want You" [Pop Edit] – 3:46

US 4-track promo-only remix 12" 
 "I Want You" [Radio Edit] – 3:34
 "I Want You" [Album Instrumental] – 3:34
 "I Want You" [Pablo Flores Import House Mix] – 8:36
 "I Want You" [Pablo Flores Club Mix] – 8:21

Charts

Weekly charts

"I Want You"

"Me Pones Sexy"

Year-end charts

Release history

References

2003 singles
Fat Joe songs
Spanish-language songs
Thalía songs
Songs written by Brenda Russell
Songs written by Cory Rooney
Virgin Records singles
2003 songs
Songs written by Fat Joe
Songs written by Thalía
English-language Mexican songs